The Lost Man is a 1969 American crime film, written and directed by Robert Alan Aurthur, loosely based on British author F.L. Green's 1945 novel Odd Man Out, which was previously made into a 1947 film directed by Carol Reed and starring James Mason.

Plot
Former US Army lieutenant Jason Higgs (Sidney Poitier), after becoming a black militant during the 1960s Black Revolutionary Movement, is wounded as he pulls a payroll heist to help imprisoned brothers, and has to hide from the police.  Social worker Cathy Ellis (Joanna Shimkus) falls in love with Higgs while helping him elude capture.

Cast
 Sidney Poitier as Jason Higgs
 Joanna Shimkus as Cathy Ellis
 Al Freeman Jr. as Dennis Lawrence
 Michael Tolan as Inspector Hamilton
 Richard Dysart as Bernie
 David Steinberg as The Photographer
 Paul Winfield as Orville Turner
 Beverly Todd as Sally Carter / Dorothy Starr
 Vonetta McGee as Diane Lawrence
 Frank Marth as Warren

Critical response
New York Times critic Vincent Canby called the film "Poitier's attempt to recognize the existence and root causes of black militancy without making anyone — white or black — feel too guilty or hopeless."  Roger Ebert wrote that "Poitier has seldom been stronger or more human." but criticized the film for "a tendency to smooth corners and tinker with the plot."

Musical score and soundtrack

The film score was composed by Quincy Jones and conducted by Stanley Wilson, and the soundtrack album was released on the Uni label in 1969.

Reception

Allmusic's Brandon Burke said the soundtrack had "In the strict sense of the word, The Lost Man was not a blaxploitation film, but its soundtrack (arranged by Quincy Jones) might lead you to think otherwise. ... Jones takes the sparse, groove-oriented route heard on the J.J. Johnson scores for Cleopatra Jones and Across 110th Street. This is most evident on downtempo numbers like the sultry "Sweet Soul Sister" (featuring Nate Turner & the Mirettes) and the opening theme. "Main Squeeze," however, is a funk bomb if ever there was one and, thankfully, its bass-driven motif runs throughout the LP. Recommended if you can find it".

Track listing
All compositions by Quincy Jones except where noted
 "The Lost Man (Main Title)" (Lyrics by Dick Cooper, Ernie Shelby) − 2:35
 "Sweet Soul Sister" (Lyrics by Cooper, Shelby) − 2:48
 "Slum Creeper" − 3:22
 "Rap, Run It on Down" (Lyrics by Cooper, Shelby) − 2:31
 "He Says He Loves Me" (Lyrics by Diane Hilderbrand, Cooper, Shelby) − 3:45
 "Main Squeeze" − 2:48
 "Try, Try, Try" (Lyrics by Cooper, Shelby) − 2:46
 "Need to Be Needed" − 4:46
 "Up Against the Wall" − 4:20
 "He'll Wash You Whiter than Snow" (Cora Martin) − 2:15
 "End Title" − 1:58

Personnel
Unidentified orchestra arranged by Quincy Jones and conducted by Stanley Wilson including:
Ernestine Anderson (track 5), The Church Choir (track 10), Venetta Fields (tracks 4 & 7),  Geraldine Jones (track 11), The kids from PASLA (track 1), The Mirettes (tracks 2, 4 & 7), The Pree Sisters (track 5), Nate Turner (tracks 2 & 4) − vocals 
Ray Brown − bass (track 11)
Arthur Adams − guitar (track 11)
Emil Richards − percussion 
Carol Kaye − electric bass 
Bud Shank − saxophone

See also
 List of American films of 1969
 List of hood films

References

External links

1969 films
1969 crime drama films
1969 romantic drama films
American crime drama films
American romantic drama films
1960s English-language films
Films about interracial romance
Films about race and ethnicity
Films based on British novels
Films scored by Quincy Jones
Films shot in Philadelphia
Universal Pictures films
1969 directorial debut films
1960s American films